Motlapele Morule (born 3 April 1981 in Bophuthatswana), also known as Mo'Molemi, is a South African recording artist and a farmer. He is a former member of Morafe which he left to venture into farming and being a solo artist. His three solo albums are Amantsi, Motsamai and Asia. His debut, Amantsi was released in 2007. He is currently signed to Botswana based media company, So Hype Records.

Studio Albums
● Amantsi (2007)
● Motzamai: Rebel Without A Pause (2010)
● A Sia (2013)
● State Of Motswako Address (2019)

References

1981 births
Living people
South African farmers
South African rappers
South African songwriters